Snare River Airport  is a private aerodrome in the Northwest Territories, Canada near the Snare River. Caribou may be found on the runway. Prior permission is required to land except in the case of an emergency.

References

Registered aerodromes in the North Slave Region